MLL Draft could mean:

MLL Collegiate Draft 
MLL Supplemental Draft